Emergency: Quantum Leap  is the debut and only extended play by South Korean boy group X1, a project group created through the 2019 Mnet survival show Produce X 101. The album was released digitally and physically on August 27, 2019, by Swing Entertainment.

Background and release
X1 was formed through the reality show Produce X 101, the fourth season of Mnet's Produce 101 series of competition shows. With the show wrapping up in July 2019, the group's label, Swing Entertainment, announced that X1 would make their official debut on August 27, 2019.

The debut EP, titled Emergency: Quantum Leap, was announced on August 1. Concept images featuring each of the members were released from August 9 to August 19.

On August 19, the tracklist was revealed, with X1 recording their own version of the songs "X1-MA", "U Got It" and "Move" from Produce X 101 for the EP. In addition, there are also four new songs included: an intro titled "Stand Up", the lead single "Flash" composed by Score, Megatone and Onestar (Monotree), "Like Always" and "I'm Here for You".

The full EP and music video for "Flash" were released on August 27, 2019.

Promotion
Prior to their debut, the group began promotions through their reality show X1 Flash, which premiered on August 22, 2019, on the cable channel Mnet. The reality show followed the members as they prepared for their debut.

The group debuted on August 27, 2019, with a debut showcase at Gocheok Sky Dome.

The group had their first music show performance on Mnet's M! Countdown on August 29, 2019. They won their first music trophy on SBS MTV's The Show on September 3.

Track listing

Charts

Weekly charts

Year-end charts

Awards and nominations

Music program wins

References

2019 debut EPs
Korean-language EPs